Vasyl Mykhaylovych Ivanchuk (born March 18, 1969), also transliterated as Vassily Ivanchuk, is a Ukrainian chess player. He was awarded the title of Grandmaster by FIDE in 1988. A leading player since 1988, Ivanchuk has been ranked at No. 2 on the FIDE world rankings three times (July 1991, July 1992, October 2007).

Ivanchuk has won Linares, Wijk aan Zee, Tal Memorial, Gibraltar Masters and M-Tel Masters titles. He has also won the World Blitz Championship in 2007 and the World Rapid Championship in 2016.

In 2011, by the decree of the President of Ukraine, Ivanchuk was awarded the Order of Prince Yaroslav the Wise.

Career

Early years
Ivanchuk was born in Kopychyntsi, Ukraine. He won the 1987 European Junior Chess Championship in Groningen and first achieved international notice by winning the 1988 New York Open scoring 7½/9 points, ahead of a field of grandmasters. He tied for first place in the 1988 World Junior Chess Championship at Adelaide, but lost the title on tiebreak to Joël Lautier. He was awarded the Grandmaster title in 1988, and entered the world top 10 the same year.

Reaches world elite
Ivanchuk attained chess world fame in 1991 at the age of 21 when he won the Linares tournament. Fourteen players participated, eight of them, including World Chess Champion Garry Kasparov, rated in the top ten in the world, and another two among the world's top 50 players. Ivanchuk edged Kasparov by a half point, defeating Kasparov in their head-to-head game.

It was widely believed that Ivanchuk might become world champion. He came close in 2002, when he reached the final of the FIDE World Chess Championship 2002. Ivanchuk consistently ranked among the top 10 from July 1988 to October 2002 and among the top 20 up to June 2009, but Mark Crowther's The Week in Chess said his erratic play was due to "poor temperament." His results saw him drop as low as 30th in July 2009, but he returned to the top ten in the next list. His inability to become world champion despite his immense talent and longevity has been attributed to his admittedly poor nerves, demonstrated by blunders such as at the 1994 London Grand Prix blitz, when he failed to complete a strong attack on Viswanathan Anand with a mate in one despite having 0:54 left on the clock. Ivanchuk's nerves were notably exposed during the high-tension atmosphere of World Championship match-format tournaments, such as in 2002 where he was heavily favored in the FIDE championship final after having defeated defending champion Anand in the semifinals, only to lose to countryman Ruslan Ponomariov in a major upset, denying him the championship. Subsequent match-play tournaments in World Championship cycles saw Ivanchuk consistently underperform; in the FIDE World Chess Championship 2004, Chess World Cup 2005, Chess World Cup 2007, and Chess World Cup 2009, he failed to advance past the third round despite being seeded No. 5, No. 1, No. 1 and No. 6 respectively in those events.

Ivanchuk's world championship aspirations were also dampened by the title split from 1993 to 2006. Due to obligations with FIDE, Ivanchuk and Anand did not participate in the 2002 Dortmund Candidates tournament for the Classical World Chess Championship 2004. He was then narrowly excluded, on the basis of rating, from the rival FIDE World Chess Championship 2005. While he won one of the events of the FIDE Grand Prix 2008–2010, his overall performance was not enough to qualify him for the World Chess Championship 2012 candidates tournament.

Since 2013
Ivanchuk played in the 2013 Candidates Tournament, which took place in London, from 15 March to 1 April. He finished seventh, with a score of +3−5=6. The tournament was notable for his unusually poor time management (he lost two games on time), as well as his major impact on the leaderboard despite being a tail ender: he managed to defeat both leaders Magnus Carlsen (round 12) and Vladimir Kramnik (round 14), resulting in Carlsen qualifying for the World Chess Championship by tiebreak.

In 2016, Ivanchuk won the World Rapid Chess Championship in Doha, Qatar, with a score of 11/15. He defeated Carlsen, among many others.

In recent years, Ivanchuk has started playing checkers and has achieved a certain level of success. In the World Draughts Federation's July 2019 ranking list he was ranked number 1111 in the world, with a rating of 1997.

Playing style 
Ivanchuk is regarded by his peers and many observers as a chess genius. Kasparov explained in an interview that Ivanchuk had a level equivalent to that of a world champion although he had never been one.

Ivanchuk has a phenomenal photographic memory which allowed him to have an extremely developed opening repertoire even before the advent of computers. He is able to play a very large number of openings at a very high level which makes it difficult to prepare against him. This was explained to him by his coach when he was young and led to a funny anecdote against Suetin.

Moreover, Ivanchuk has a very imaginative game with many new ideas that mixes imagination, technique, ingenuity, maturity of style and fighting spirit.

Assessment and personality 

In 2013, Gawain Jones called Ivanchuk "possibly the most talented [player] ever". When asked in 2012 to name chess players she considered geniuses, Judit Polgár named only Ivanchuk, Carlsen and Anand.

Anand has called Ivanchuk the most eccentric player in the chess world, and has said:

He's someone who is very intelligent ... but you never know which mood he is going to be in. Some days he will treat you like his long-lost brother. The next day he ignores you completely.

The players have a word for him. They say he lives on "Planet Ivanchuk". [Laughs] ... I have seen him totally drunk and singing Ukrainian poetry and then the next day I have seen him give an impressive talk.

His playing style is unpredictable and highly original, making him more dangerous but sometimes leading to quick losses as well.

From the Mammoth Book of The World Greatest Chess Games:
If he were able to make the most of his talent, he would surely be a real contender for the World No. 1 spot, but he is a highly emotional player, who takes losses badly, tends to rush critical decisions when under pressure and sometimes lacks motivation.

After a string of unsuccessful performances culminated in his elimination at the early stages of the 2009 World Cup, Ivanchuk announced, in a highly emotional interview, his retirement from professional chess, but he soon reversed that decision.

Notable tournament victories

 Lviv 1987, 11½/17 1st
 New York Open 1988, 1st
 Debrecen 1988, 10 8/11 1st
 Linares 1989, 7/10 1st
 Yerevan 1989, 8½/11 1st
 Biel 1989, 9/14 1–2
 Tilburg 1990, 8½/14 1–2
 Linares 1991, 9½/13 1st
 Reykjavik 10½/15, 1–2
 Munich 1994, 7½/11 1st
 Linares 1995, 10/13 1st
 Horgen GER 1995, 7/10 1–2
 Wijk aan Zee 1996, 9/13 1st
 Belgrade 1997 6/9, 1–2
 Tallinn 2000 6/7, 1st
 Montecatini Terme 2000, 5/7 1st
 Malmö 2003, 13 7/9 1st
 European Individual Chess Championship 2004
 European Rapid Chess Championship 2004
 La Habana 2005, 9½/12 1st
 Barcelona 2005, 4/5 1–2
 Canadian Open Chess Championship 2005, Joint 1st
 Tallinn 2006, 7/9 1–3
 Odesa 2006, 7/9 1st
 Mérida 2006, 1st
 Odesa 2007, 7/9 1st
 La Habana 2007, 7½/9 1st
 Foros 2007, 7½/11 1st
 FIDE World Blitz Chess Champion 2007
 Montreal International 2007
 M-Tel Masters, Sofia 2008 8/10 2008, 1st
 Tal Memorial, Moscow 2008, 6/9 1st
 Tal Memorial (Blitz), Moscow 2008, 1st
 Linares 2009 8/14, Joint 1st (Alexander Grischuk declared winner because of higher number of wins)
 Bazna 2009, 7/10 1st
 Jermuk 2009, 8½/13 1st
 Amber Rapid 2010, 8/11 Joint 1st (with Magnus Carlsen)
 Amber Overall 2010, Joint 1st (with Magnus Carlsen)
 Capablanca Memorial Havana 2010, 7/10 1st
 Cap d'Agde Rapid 2010, 1st
 Gibraltar 2011, 9/10 1st
 Capablanca Memorial Havana 2011, 6½/10 1st
 Grand Slam Bilbao – São Paulo 2011, Joint 1st (Magnus Carlsen wins the tie-break blitz games)
 Capablanca Memorial Havana, Cuba 2012, 6½/10,  1st.
 World Rapid Championship 2016, 1st

Team chess performances

Ivanchuk has often been at his best in international team competitions. He has played in 14 Chess Olympiads, twice for the Soviet Union (1988 and 1990), and twelve times for Ukraine, after the Soviet Union split up in 1991. He has won a total of thirteen medals, and has been on four gold-medal winning teams (USSR in 1988 and 1990, Ukraine in 2004 and 2010). In 162 games, Ivanchuk has scored (+63 =87 -12), for 65.7 per cent. His detailed Olympiad records are as follows:

 Thessaloniki 1988, USSR 2nd reserve, 6½/9 (+4 −0 =5), team gold
 Novi Sad 1990, USSR board 1, 7/10 (+5 −1 =4), team gold, board bronze
 Manila 1992, Ukraine board 1, 8½/13 (+6 −1 =5)
 Moscow 1994, Ukraine board 1, 9½/14 (+5 −0 =9)
 Yerevan 1996, Ukraine board 1, 8½/11 (+6 −0 =5), team silver, board silver, perf. bronze
 Elista 1998, Ukraine board 1, 7/11 (+3 −0 =8), team bronze
 Istanbul 2000, Ukraine board 1, 9/14 (+4 −0 =10), team bronze
 Bled 2002, Ukraine board 2, 9/14 (+4 −0 =10)
 Calvià 2004, Ukraine board 1, 9½/13 (+6 −0 =7), team gold, board bronze
 Turin 2006, Ukraine board 1, 8/13 (+4 −1 =8)
 Dresden 2008, Ukraine board 1, 6/11 (+3 −2 =6)
 Khanty-Mansiysk 2010, Ukraine board 1, 8/10 (+7 −1 =2), team gold, board gold
 Istanbul 2012, Ukraine board 1, 6/10 (+4 –2 =4), team bronze
 Tromsø 2014, Ukraine board 1, 4/9 (+2 –3 =4)

Notable games
Ivanchuk vs Kasparov, Linares 1991
At round one of Linares in 1991, the 21-year-old Ivanchuk gave up both his bishops for knights and then boxed Kasparov, then world champion, into complete passivity.

Personal life
Ivanchuk was first married to Alisa Galliamova, also a chess player. On November 18, 2006, he married for the second time.

In 2011, Ivanchuk and his second wife were mugged the day they were set to leave from São Paulo, Brazil, on a plane bound for Spain to finish the second half of the Bilbao Grand Slam Masters. Ivanchuk threatened to withdraw from the tournament altogether, but his wife convinced him to continue. He had been leading in the tournament before this event, but did not play as well in the second half of the tournament.

2008 Chess Olympiad incident 
Ivanchuk played board 1 for Ukraine in the 2008 Chess Olympiad in Dresden, Germany. Going into the last round, Ukraine was second with decent chances of placing first, and only a strong loss against a 10th-seeded U.S. would leave them without a medal. Ivanchuk was chosen to be tested for illegal substances in his system immediately after the last round.

In a major upset, the U.S. defeated Ukraine 3½ to ½ with Ivanchuk losing his game against Gata Kamsky, causing Ukraine to fall to fourth and miss out on a medal. Ivanchuk was so distraught after the game that he was seen "kicking a large concrete pillar". He refused to take a doping test and stormed out, risking punishment under FIDE rules and forfeiting his games in the event as had happened in the 2004 Chess Olympiad in Majorca. Ivanchuk was cleared when it emerged that he had not been warned of the test, and that in his distraught frame of mind, he had not fully understood the arbiter's request.

Notes

References

External links

 
 
 
 
 Vassily Ivanchuk FIDE rating history at benoni.de
 Interview with Vassily Ivanchuk (2000)
 Interview of Vassily Ivanchuk: I can still become World Champion" (2011)

1969 births
Living people
Chess grandmasters
Chess Olympiad competitors
Ukrainian chess players
Ukrainian draughts players
European Chess Champions
People from Kopychyntsi